Susie Dent (born 1964) is an English lexicographer, etymologist, and media personality. She has appeared in "Dictionary Corner" on the Channel 4 game show Countdown since 1992. She also appears on 8 Out of 10 Cats Does Countdown, a post-watershed comedy version of the show presented by comedian Jimmy Carr. She has been honorary vice-president of the Chartered Institute of Editing and Proofreading since 2016.

Early life and education
Dent was born in Woking, Surrey. She was educated at the Marist Convent in Ascot, an independent Roman Catholic day school, with a term at Eton College to study for Oxbridge entrance exams. She went on to Somerville College, Oxford for her BA in modern languages, then to Princeton University for her master's degree in German.

Career
Dent's first job was as a waitress. When she began work on Countdown in 1992, she had just started working for the Oxford University Press on producing English dictionaries, having previously worked on bilingual dictionaries.

Dent is well known as the resident lexicographer and adjudicator for the letters rounds on Channel 4's long-running game show Countdown. On each episode, she also provides a brief commentary on the origin of a particular word or phrase. Dent is the longest-serving member of the show's current on-screen team, first appearing in 1992; she has made more than 5,000 appearances. Dent also works on the spin-off show 8 Out of 10 Cats Does Countdown.

Dent appeared as herself in an episode of the BBC sitcom Not Going Out.

Dent presented Channel 4 web series Susie Dent's Guide to Swearing, which explored the etymology and history of select English swear words. She has also made an appearance on BBC entertainment show Would I Lie to You?. In 2018, she also appeared on five episodes of the panel show House of Games hosted by Richard Osman.

In 2019, Dent launched the gold award podcast, Something Rhymes With Purple, co-hosted with her friend Gyles Brandreth and have followed up with their live theatre stage residencies using the same formula as their podcast.

In 2023, Dent embarked on her, "The Secret Lives Of Words" solo tour.

Published books
From 2003 to 2007, Dent was the author of a series of yearly Language Reports for the Oxford University Press (OUP). The first was simply titled The Language Report, and this was followed by Larpers and Shroomers (2004); Fanboys and Overdogs (2005); The Like, Language Report for Real (2006); and The Language Report: English on the Move 2000 – 2007 (2007). The format of this publication was revised for 2008 as an A–Z collection of new and newly resurrected words. It was published in October 2008 as Words of the Year.

In 2005 the same publisher issued Winning Words, and in 2009 What Made the Crocodile Cry? 101 questions about the English language. Dent's book about dialects, How to Talk Like a Local, was published in March 2010.

Personal life 
Dent was married to Paul Atkins, a teacher, and has two daughters.  They separated in 2021.

References

External links 
 
 
 
 
 

Living people
1964 births
Alumni of Somerville College, Oxford
Countdown (game show)
English lexicographers
21st-century English non-fiction writers
English television personalities
Oxford University Press people
People from Woking
Princeton University alumni
Television personalities from Surrey
Women lexicographers
British women podcasters
English podcasters